USS Inca is a name used more than once by the U.S. Navy:

 , a screw steamer, was built in 1898 by George Lawley & Son, South Boston, Massachusetts.
 , a steam ferry, was built for the Navy by Herreshoff Manufacturing Co., Bristol, Rhode Island, in 1911.
 , a motor boat, built in 1917 by Herreshoff Manufacturing Co., Bristol, Rhode Island.
 , an iron tugboat, was built in 1879 by J. H. Dialogue & Sons, Camden, New Jersey.
 , an unclassified miscellaneous vessel, would have been the fifth ship of the United States Navy to be named for the Inca Empire if she had received that name.

United States Navy ship names